Zinda Rood is a 4 volume biographical work by Justice Javed Iqbal about his father Muhammad Iqbal, a Muslim poet-philosopher. Zinda Rood is translated as "living stream of life", a pseudonym Muhammad Iqbal used for himself in his Persian Masnavi Javid Nama.The complete biography has been unified and translated in Kannada language as "Baduku Baraha" (ಬದುಕು ಬರಹ) by Dr. Ismath Unnisa a renowned Kannada professor and writer.

See also 
 Index of Muhammad Iqbal–related articles

External links
 

Read Zinda Rood 1 in Urdu
Read Zinda Rood 2 in Urdu
Read Zinda Rood 3 in Urdu
Read Zinda Rood 4 in Urdu

Muhammad Iqbal
Pakistani biographies
Pakistani non-fiction literature